Old Governor's Mansion may refer to:

 Old Governor's Mansion, part of the Sharlot Hall Museum (Prescott, Arizona) 
 Old Governor's Mansion (Milledgeville, Georgia)
 Old Governor's Mansion (Frankfort, Kentucky)
 Old Governor's Mansion (Baton Rouge, Louisiana)
 Old Governor's Mansion (Columbus, Ohio)
 Old Governor's Mansion (Madison, Wisconsin)

See also
Governor's Mansion (disambiguation)
Governor's House (disambiguation)